Menlo Ventures is a venture capital firm based in Menlo Park, California with an additional office in San Francisco, California. The firm was founded as one of the earliest venture capital firms in Silicon Valley in 1976 and provides technology venture capital funding for seed, early stage and growth companies.

Investments
Menlo Ventures invests in consumer Internet, mobile, communications infrastructure, enterprise, security and storage. Since its founding in 1976, the firm has invested in more than 400 companies, including Uber, Gilead Sciences, Fab.com, Roku, Inc., Credit Sesame, Dropcam, HP 3PAR, IronPort, Machine Zone, Siri, PlaySpan, Coraid, Inc., Rover.com, Warby Parker and Vidyo. Its past and current portfolio includes more than 70 public companies and more than 100 mergers or acquisitions. In 2017, Menlo revamped how they used their proprietary software to improve its investing strategy. As of May 2017, the firm had $5 billion under management including Menlo Ventures XIV, a $450M fund. Current Menlo investments have a total of over $3 billion in aggregate revenue.

References

External links 
 

Financial services companies established in 1976
IronPort people
Venture capital firms of the United States
Companies based in Menlo Park, California
American companies established in 1976